Foo Files is a series of EPs released by Foo Fighters starting in 2019. Available through streaming media services, the EPs consist of the B-sides released by the band through its trajectory, along with selected live performances. All the titles list the years of the song's releases plus "25" to celebrate the 25th anniversary of the Foo Fighters in 2020.

Track listings

00950025

00111125 - Live in London
The tracks were taken from the band's performance at the Roundhouse for the 2011 iTunes Festival.

00070725 Live at Studio 606
The tracks were taken from a 2007 performance at the band's own Studio 606, in Northridge, California, for the online show Walmart Soundcheck.

00050525 Live In Roswell
Released in the same day the Storm Area 51 event would happen, it is a 2005 performance at the Walker Air Force Base in Roswell, New Mexico.

01070725
This EP contains B-sides for the singles from the 2007 album Echoes, Silence, Patience & Grace.

00020225
This EP contains B-sides for the singles from the 2002 album One by One.

01050525

This EP contains B-sides for the singles from the 2005 album In Your Honor and contains most songs from Five Songs and a Cover. Also released as 02050525 with only the first six tracks.

00999925

This EP contains B-sides for the singles from the 1999 album There Is Nothing Left to Lose, and is also available as  01999925, with only the first five tracks.

00979725
This EP contains B-sides for the singles from the 1997 album The Colour and the Shape.

00959525
This EP contains B-sides for the singles from the 1995 album Foo Fighters.

References

Foo Fighters EPs
B-side compilation albums
2019_compilation_albums
2019 live albums
2020_compilation_albums
RCA Records compilation albums
RCA Records EPs
Foo Fighters compilation albums